(Ainu: Kamuy-to) is an endorheic crater lake formed in the caldera of a potentially active volcano. It is located in Akan Mashu National Park on the island of Hokkaido, Japan. It has been called the clearest lake in the world.

Hydrology

It has no significant inlets and no outlet. The lake is one of the clearest in the world and one of the deepest in Japan. Around the same time Lake Baikal was measured . This is the basis for the lake's claim to be the clearest in the world. The loss in transparency is probably due to the introduction of sockeye salmon and rainbow trout into the lake and landslides. At the same time, the clarity of Lake Baikal has not been measured.

In summer, the surface of Lake Mashū is often obscured by fog. There is usually fog covering around the lake for about 100 days of the year. This has given the lake a reputation for mysteriousness. A local legend says that if you can see the surface of the lake, you will have bad luck.

Origin of the name
Lake Mashū was originally named Lake of the Devil by the Ainu. Over time, however, the Japanese began to refer to the lake by the Japanese reading for the neighboring peak, . The kanji for this peak translate roughly as scrubbed area mountain. The Ainu name for this peak, by which it is commonly known today, is Kamuinupuri or mountain of the gods. The lake also retains its Ainu name, Kamuito or lake of the gods.

Volcanic caldera

Mashū formed less than 32,000 years ago. The caldera is the remains of a stratovolcano, which is actually a parasitic cone of the larger Lake Kussharo caldera. The eruption that created the current caldera occurred around 7,000 years ago. The last eruption was a plinian eruption about 2,000 years ago that dropped pumice over the region.

Mashū volcano is rated with a Volcanic Explosivity Index of 6, the third highest among large volcanoes.

Two volcanoes have grown out of the Mashū caldera. Kamuishu Island, a lava dome which rises from the middle of the lake, is one. The other is Mount Kamui, a stratovolcano with lava dome, which forms the highest point on the eastern shore. A third volcano neighbors Kamuinupuri. It is Mount Nishibetsu. Mount Nishibetsu probably predates the caldera.

The main rock type of the volcanoes is andesite and dacite. The rock is non-alkali pyroclastic flow or mafic rock, dating from the Late Pleistocene to the Holocene. Some rock around the Mashū crater and Mount Nishibetsu is older still, dating from the Middle Pleistocene.

The following table lists the eruptions of the Mashū volcano and Kamuinupuri.

Flora and fauna
The lake is inhabited by phytoplankton and zooplankton.
 Melosira spp.
 Synedra sp.
  Daphnia longispina
  Bosmina coregoni

Sockeye salmon and rainbow trout have been introduced to the lake.

On the slopes around and above the lake grow a mixture of evergreen forest with Picea jezoensis and  Abies sachalinensis and birch forest with Betula ermanii.

Economy

The Mashu-dake Hiking Course is a trail that goes along the crater rim and to the top of Mount Mashū. The trail leads through forest and grassland for about seven kilometers and takes about 2.5 to 3 hours to hike one way. There are no settlements along the shores of the lake. Access to the lakeshore itself is prohibited by the Ministry of the Environment (Japan). Visitors may only view the lake from the designated observation towers.

In popular culture 
Sendoff Spring in Pokémon Diamond and Pearl and Pokémon Platinum is based on this lake as the Sinnoh region is a fictionalized version of Hokkaido.

See also
Tourism in Japan
List of lakes in Japan

References

External links

 Mashu - Japan Meteorological Agency 
  - Japan Meteorological Agency
 Mashu - Geological Survey of Japan
 Mashu: Global Volcanism Program - Smithsonian Institution
 Teshikaga Navi - Teshikaga Town

Calderas of Hokkaido
Endorheic lakes of Asia
Volcanic crater lakes
Lakes of Hokkaido
Volcanoes of Hokkaido
VEI-6 volcanoes
Holocene calderas
Potentially active volcanoes
Parasitic cones